Wilderlands of the Fantastic Reaches is a supplement for fantasy role-playing games published by Judges Guild in 1980. (JG 300)

Contents
Wilderlands of the Fantastic Reaches is a campaign setting that describes the locations on four large wilderness maps (Wilderness Maps 15-18).

The regions of the Isle of Dawn (#15), the Southern Reaches (#16), the Silver Skein Isles (#17), and the Ghinor Highlands (#18) are shown in full detail on the judge's maps and are roughly sketched out on the players' maps. The booklet describes and gives the location of many of the villages, castles, islands, ruins, relics, and monsters.

Publication history
Wilderlands of the Fantastic Reaches features a cover by Jennell Jaquays, and was published by Judges Guild in 1980 as two 16-page booklets, four large maps, and a cover sheet.

Reception
William Fawcett reviewed Wilderlands of the Fantastic Reaches in The Dragon #44.  Fawcett commented that "This set of maps and their index is one of the most massive efforts of the Judges Guild. These maps when viewed as a whole are a gigantic effort and have to be considered one of the major projects in roleplaying games. When all spread out, these are the only gaming maps that surpass the GDW Europa maps in size."

Notes

References

External links
 Judge's Guild Products by Title at acaeum.com.
 Wilderlands of the Fantastic Reaches at acaeum.com.
 Wilderlands Campaign Maps at acaeum.com.
 City State Campaign - Judges Guild at waynesbooks.com.

Judges Guild fantasy role-playing game supplements
Role-playing game supplements introduced in 1980